50 Penn Place is an upscale mixed-use complex in the inner Northwest part of Oklahoma City, Oklahoma. The galleria-style shopping mall and tower is located at 1900 Northwest Expressway in the Penn Square trade area immediately at I-44 and Northwest Expressway, across from Penn Square Mall near the exclusive suburb of Nichols Hills.

The complex consists of a 16-storey office tower, upscale retail shops on 3 levels , and a parking structure.

Midland Oak Realty purchased the building from MBL Life Assurance for $15 million in 1997.  The complex was later owned by a Dallas-based capital management company, which bought the building for $25.7 million in 2004, along with 25 tenants-in-common.  A planned sale fell through in 2008.  In March 2011, In-Rel Properties based in Lake Worth, Florida, purchased the building for $15.25 million and invested over $1 million in renovations.

History

The complex was built in 1973 by C.W. Cameron, founder of American Fidelity.  For the next twenty years it was a landmark due to four red piggy bank signs (One on all four sides of the Elevator tower on top of the building.) with a big "S" in the center, belonging to Sooner Federal Savings and Loan who had their home offices in the Building at the time. It was also formerly home to a couple of Oklahoma locally owned chain of high end retail stores such as Balliets a women's boutique and the flagship store of Orbach's which closed in 1990. Although not currently anchored by a major retailer, 50 Penn Place still has upscale shops and restaurants, a brewpub, independent bookstore, the 50 Penn Place Art Gallery, and various office tenants including LexisNexis. In recent years, the retail portion of the complex has lost the majority of its tenants to other nearby shopping venues, such as Penn Square Mall right across the street, and Classen Curve a newly built modern upscale shopping center in Nichols Hills. Because of this, 50 Penn Place is no longer seen by locals as an upscale shopping destination. However, several upscale tenants still remain, and former retail space is being leased to other tenants, such as ITT Technical Institute. In March 2011, In-Rel Properties purchased the building for $15.25 million and invested over $1 million in renovations.

Tenants
 50 Penn Place Gallery
 Belle Isle Brewery Company
 Branch Communications
 Capital Insurance Group
 Craig E. Brown, PC
 Full Circle Bookstore & Cafe
 Futurity First Insurance Group
 iHeartCommunications, Inc.
Radio Stations:
 KREF-FM (94.7) - Sports (94.7 The Ref)
 KGHM-AM (1340) - Sports/Sports talk (Fox Sports Radio)
 KJYO-FM (102.7) - Top 40 Rock (Also known as KJ-103)
 KTOK-AM (1000) - News Radio 1000 KTOK (News/Talk)
 KTST-FM (101.9) - The Newest Country Hits (101-9 The Twister)
 KXXY-FM (96.1) - Classic Country (96.1 KXY)
 98.5 El Patron (98.5) KREF-FM HD2 - Regional Mexican (98.5 El Patron) 
 ITT Technical Institute
 Inceed Employment Professionals
 Jameson Management
 Legacy Investment Services
 LexisNexis Risk Solutions
 Mahin's Full Service Salon
 Mee Mee Hoge & Epperson, PLLP
 Midwest Private Client Group
 Oklahoma City Abstract & Title Company
 Pinpoint Resource Fine Wear
 Regent Bank
 Route 66 Gift Shop
 Summit Group
 Wilsey Meyer Eatmon Tate, PLLC
 Olive Garden Italian Kitchen (separate building on the premises)

See also
List of tallest buildings in Oklahoma City

References

External links
 http://www.in-rel.com/inrel-properties/50-penn-place/

Shopping malls in Oklahoma
Shopping malls established in 1973
Buildings and structures in Oklahoma City
Skyscraper office buildings in Oklahoma City
1973 establishments in Oklahoma